Waveney is a constituency represented in the House of Commons of the UK Parliament since 2010 by Peter Aldous, a Conservative.

History 
The seat was created for the 1983 general election following the implementation of the third periodic review of Westminster constituencies, broadly replacing Lowestoft, which the first victor of the new seat had served since 1959.

Political history 
Waveney has been a bellwether since its creation, swinging heavily in line with the mood of the nation. Labour's big majority in 1997 reflected the large overall majority in the Commons, and by the 2010 election it had become touted by one published analysis as the seat that the Conservatives needed to win to secure an overall majority. Fittingly, 2010 saw a marginal majority and the national result was a hung parliament with the Conservative Party the largest party.  2010 here was the Labour Party's second highest share of the vote in the narrow, traditional grouping of East Anglia (Suffolk, Norfolk and Essex).

Prominent frontbenchers 
Waveney had been held for many years by James Prior, Minister of Agriculture, Fisheries and Food (1970–1972), Leader of the House of Commons (1972–1974), Secretary of State for Employment (1979–1981), then Secretary of State for Northern Ireland during the Thatcher ministry, with an economic politics considered more centre-ground, then known as forming the wets' ideology.

Bob Blizzard served as a senior Government Whip from 2008 until 2010 when he lost at the election that May.

Constituency profile 
The seat is based around the town of Lowestoft and includes several smaller market towns and seaside resorts in northeast Suffolk. Electoral Calculus describes the seat as a "Somewhere", characterised by older, less educated voters with strong support for Brexit.

This corner of Suffolk arguably has stronger connections with Norfolk – Norwich is an easier centre to reach than Ipswich – and there have been unsuccessful proposals to alter the county boundary to reflect this.

Boundaries and boundary changes	

1983–1997: The District of Waveney.

The constituency was formed from the abolished constituency of Lowestoft, with the exception of a small part in the north which was now part of Norfolk.

1997–2010: The District of Waveney except the wards of Blything, Halesworth, and Southwold.

Three wards transferred to Suffolk Coastal.

2010–present: The District of Waveney wards of Beccles North, Beccles South, Bungay, Carlton, Carlton Colville, Gunton and Corton, Harbour, Kessingland, Kirkley, Lothingland, Normanston, Oulton, Oulton Broad, Pakefield, St Margaret's, The Saints, Wainford, Whitton, and Worlingham.

Marginal changes due to revision of local authority wards.

The seat is based on the coastal town of Lowestoft, which today is generally Labour-voting, because of its recent history as a declining seaside resort, fishing and industrial town. However, the constituency also takes in the small towns of Beccles and Bungay. These along with the smaller inland rural villages are considerably more supportive of Conservatives.

Members of Parliament

Elections

Elections in the 2010s

Elections in the 2000s

Elections in the 1990s

Elections in the 1980s

See also
 List of parliamentary constituencies in Suffolk

Notes

References

Lowestoft
Parliamentary constituencies in Suffolk
Constituencies of the Parliament of the United Kingdom established in 1983
Waveney District